Henry Thomas (born 30 October 1991) is a rugby union player for Montpellier in the Top 14. He plays as a prop.

Club career
In the 2010–11 season, Henry started as captain of the Sale Sharks. Continuing his good performances for the Jets, in October he progressed to the senior squad, continuing to make 14 Premiership appearances in the season.

In June 2012, Henry Thomas was called up to England Saxons along with other Sharks Rob Miller and James Gaskell

In January 2014 it was announced that Thomas would join Bath on a three-year deal for the 2014–15 season.

On 27 July 2021, Thomas left Bath after seven years with the club to join French side Montpellier in the Top 14 competition ahead of the 2021–22 season.

International career
In June 2011 he participated in the Junior World Championship in which he scored one try against Ireland.

On 27 January it was reported that Henry had been picked for England in the 2013 Six Nations as injury replacement for Alex Corbisiero but he was not used. He then went to appear in the 2013 Tour of Argentina in which he came off the bench to win his first two caps against Argentina.

References

External links

Sale Sharks profile
England profile

1991 births
Living people
Alumni of the University of Manchester
Bath Rugby players
England international rugby union players
English rugby union players
People educated at Millfield
Rugby union players from Kingston upon Thames
Rugby union props
Sale Sharks players